"Another Sunday and Sweet F.A." is a television play written by Jack Rosenthal and directed by Michael Apted for Granada Television and which was first broadcast on 9 January 1972 in the ITV Sunday Night Theatre strand. It stars David Swift, Freddie Fletcher and Gordon McGrase. It also features Anne Kirkbride, who as a result of her performance was cast in Coronation Street in the role of Deirdre Barlow.

The play won the TV Critics' Circle Best Play of the Year Award.

Plot
Eric Armistead (David Swift) is a Sunday league association football referee. Rosenthal explained that for him "life is an Immorality Play. Right never triumphs over wrong. Good never vanquishes evil. No one knows the meaning of 'fairness'. Which is why he's a Sunday morning referee – hoping that in his own small way, in a foreign field that's forever Manchester, he and his whistle might change the world." He referees a match between Sunday league teams Parker Street Depot XI and Co-Op Albion XI, but the game is ugly and violent, and it ends with the referee, driven to exasperation by the players, heading the ball into the net for the winning goal.

Cast
 David Swift as Eric Armistead
 Gordon McGrae as Parker Street captain
 Fred Feast as Parker Street coach
 Freddie Fletcher as Albion captain
 Duggie Brown as Albion Coach
 Bert King as Albion Linesman
 David Bradley as Goalie
 Joe Gladwin as Sam
 Michael de Frayne as Norman
 Susan Littler as Jeannie
 Clare Kelly as Gwen
 Lynne Carol as Woman with Dog
 Anne Kirkbride and Clare Sutcliffe as players' girlfriends
 Alan Erasmus and Stephen Bent as Parker Street players
 Roy Nield, Joey Kaye and John Procter as Albion players
 Bruce Watt, Brian Sweeney and Dominic Toner as Boys

Critical reaction
At the time of broadcast, Chris Dunkley in The Times was critical calling it "not a bad play" that "failed continually to live up to a feeling of promise, and a hint of something better to come". However, Dunkley praised Swift's performance in what was "an unusual part for any actor".

Later appraisals have been more favourable. Peter Sharkey in 2005 called it "possibly the greatest dramatic portrayal of football ever seen on our screens", praising details like players arriving clutching cigarettes and the goalkeeper arguing with his girlfriend as he leans against the posts, as well as the atmosphere of alcohol and bad pitches.

The BFI website says "Not much happens ... but the accumulation of detail exudes authenticity." Leslie Halliwell in his  Teleguide (1979) calls it an "amusing north-country comedy".

It is held in high esteem by specialist sports writers. Frank Keating called it a "classic" of sport-themed drama. Peter Seddon of The Times included in his list of ten classic football dramas.

DVD
It was included in the 2006 DVD box set Jack Rosenthal at ITV.

References

External links
 

1972 British television episodes
1972 television plays
British television plays
ITV Sunday Night Theatre
Television shows produced by Granada Television